The gongfu tea ceremony or kung fu tea ceremony ( or ), is a type of Chinese tea ceremony, involving the ritual preparation and presentation of tea. It is probably based on the tea preparation approaches originated in Fujian and the Chaoshan area of eastern Guangdong. The term literally means "making tea with skill". The approach often involves using smaller brewing vessels and a higher leaf-to-water ratio than in western-style brewing. Today, the approach is used popularly by teashops carrying tea of Chinese origins, and by tea connoisseurs as a way to maximize the taste of a tea selection, especially a finer one.

History 
Attention to tea-making quality has been a classic Chinese tradition. All teas, loose tea, coarse tea, and powdered tea have long coexisted with the "imperially appointed compressed form". By the end of the 14th century, the more naturalistic "loose leaf" form had become a popular household product and by the Ming era, loose tea was put to imperial use.

The related teaware that is the tea pot and later the gaiwan lidded cup were evolved. It is believed that the gongfu tea preparation approach began only in around the 18th century. Some scholars think that it began in Wuyi in Fujian, where the production of oolong tea for export began; others believe that it was the people in Chaozhou in the Chaoshan area in Guangdong started this particular part of the tea culture.

Oral history from the 1940s still referred to Gongfu Cha as Chaoshan Gongfu Cha. It is likely that regardless of the earliest incidence of the approach, the place that first successfully integrated it into daily life was Chaoshan area. Chaozhou is recognized by some as the capital of gongfu tea.

Chemistry and physics
In essence, what is desired in Gongfu Cha is a brew that tastes good and is satisfying to the soul.  Tea masters in China and other Asian tea cultures study for years to perfect this method.  However, method alone will not determine whether a great cup of tea will be produced.  Essentially, two things have to be taken into consideration: chemistry and temperature.

Water chemistry
Water should be given careful consideration when conducting Gongfu Cha. Water which tastes or smells bad will adversely affect the brewed tea. However, distilled or extremely soft water should never be used as this form of water lacks minerals, which will negatively affect the flavor of the tea and so can result in a "flat" brew. For these reasons, most tea masters will use a good clean local source of spring water. If this natural spring water is not available, bottled spring water will suffice. Yet high content mineral water also needs to be avoided.  It is said that hard water needs to be filtered although the mineral content of even very hard water is solvated, and no amount of filtering will affect it.

Temperature
During the process of Gongfucha, the tea master will first determine the appropriate temperature for the tea being used, in order to extract the aroma of the tea. An optimal temperature must be reached and maintained. The water temperature depends on the type of tea used.
Guidelines are as follows:
  for green tea ( typical)
  for white tea ( typical)
  for oolong tea ( typical)
  (boiling) for compressed teas, such as pu-erh tea

The temperature of the water can be determined by timing, as well as the size and the sizzling sound made by the air bubbles in the kettle.
They are accompanied by loud, rapid sizzling sounds.
 When the water is boiling, neither the formation of air bubbles nor sizzling sounds occurs.

At high altitudes water boils at lower temperatures, so the above temperature ranges should be adjusted.

Tools and equipment
Below is a list of the main items used in a gongfu tea ceremony in Taiwan, known there as 老人茶 (Pinyin: Lǎorénchá).

 Brewing vessel, Yixing teapot, porcelain teapot, or a covered bowl gaiwan. 
 Tea pitcher (chahai), or any matching size decanting vessel, used to ensure the consistency of the flavor of the tea (Chinese: 公道杯, Pinyin: gōng dào bēi).
 Hot water kettle, e.g. an electric kettle.
 Brewing tray, or a deep, flat bottom porcelain plate to hold spills (spills are typical).
 Tea towel or tea cloth, usually dark colored.
 Tea knife or tea pick for clearing the teapot spout and separating leaves from tea cakes.
 Tea cups (traditionally three cups are used in most instances), matching size. Also named Pinming Cup. 
 Timer.
 Strainer, a tea strainer sometimes built into the tea pitchers.
 Tea holder, tea leaf holder for weighing and dispensing, or a wooden tea spoon to measure the amount of tea leaves required (Chinese: 茶匙, Pinyin: chá chí).
 Optional: Tea basin or bowl used as the receptacle for used tea leaves and refuse water.
 Optional: Scale.
 Optional: Kitchen thermometer.
 Optional: Scent cup (snifter cup) used to appreciate the tea's aroma (Chinese: traditional 聞香杯, simplified 闻香杯, Pinyin wén xiāng bēi).
 Optional: A pair of tongs called "Jiā" (Chinese: 挾) or "Giab" in both the Chao Zhou and Min Nan dialects.
 Optional: A calligraphy-style brush with a wooden handle, which is used to spread the wasted tea evenly over the tea tray to ensure no part dries out and the tea "stain" is spread evenly to ensure a pleasing colour to the tray.

A tea pet, usually made from the same clay as a Yixing teapot, is fun to have. One kind of "tea pet" is a "tea boy". Prior to the tea ceremony, he is soaked in cold water. Hot water poured over him during the tea ceremony will make him "pee".
Traditionally these 'pets' are classical Chinese figurines, such as a Dragon, Lion Turtle, or Toad, and are used as a receptacle over which the wasted tea is poured, usually to develop a patina.

Notable masters
Yu Hui Tseng

References 

Chinese tea culture
Hokkien culture
Teochew culture